Linda Black (nee Fischer) is a former member of the Missouri House of Representatives, serving from 2009 to 2017. Before being elected to the legislature, Black was a public school teacher. She has also served as treasurer of Bonne Terre and Chief Deputy Treasurer of St. Francois County.

Black was elected to the Missouri House as a member of the Democratic Party. After Republicans made gains in the Missouri House in the 2014 elections, Black announced her intention to switch parties, citing her anti-abortion views.

References

External links
 
Legislative website

1970 births
21st-century American politicians
Central Methodist University alumni
Living people
Members of the Missouri House of Representatives
Missouri Democrats
Missouri Republicans
People from Bonne Terre, Missouri
Southwest Baptist University alumni
Women state legislators in Missouri
21st-century American women politicians